Suzanne Otterson (born 26 March 1974) is a British former figure skater. She competed at the 1992 Winter Olympics.

References

1974 births
Living people
Sportspeople from Ayr
Scottish female single skaters
British female single skaters
Figure skaters at the 1992 Winter Olympics
Olympic figure skaters of Great Britain
Place of birth missing (living people)